Ahmad Suradji (10 January 1949 – 10 July 2008), also known as Nasib Klewang and Datuk Maringgi, was an Indonesian serial killer who admitted to murdering 42 girls and women between 1986 and 1997. Suradji's victims, ranging in age between 11 and 30, were strangled after being buried in the ground up to their waists as part of a ritual. He buried his victims in a sugarcane plantation near his home with their heads facing his house, which he believed would give him extra power.

Background
Ahmad Suradji lived in Medan, the capital and largest city of Indonesia's North Sumatra province. He worked as a cattle-breeder and as a dukun, a class of shaman reputed to possess supernatural powers. Suradji's clientele were often women seeking his guidance on how to find good fortune or maintain their beauty. According to Suradji, his deceased father visited him in a dream in 1986 and commanded him to murder 70 women as part of a black magic ritual.

Murders

On 24 April 1997, 21-year-old Sri Kemala Dewi asked a 15-year-old rickshaw puller named Andreas to take her to "Datuk". She informed him to keep it a secret and never requested to be picked up. Three days later, Dewi's naked and decomposing body was found in a sugarcane field by a man and was later dug up by a group of people who then called the police. Andreas reported to the police and Dewi's family that he had dropped her off at Suradji's house three days earlier, and so police visited Suradji to question him about it. Although he at first denied having anything to do with Dewi's death, police found her handbag, dress and bracelet in his home. He was later arrested on April 30, 1997. During interrogation, Suradji eventually confessed to Dewi's murder but also revealed that he had killed up to 42 girls in the same fashion and an excavation had to be carried out in the sugarcane field where Dewi's body had been found. Throughout the process, 42 bodies were exhumed with some being decomposed to the point where they were unidentifiable.

He told police that he had a dream in 1986 in which his father's ghost directed him to drink the saliva of 70 dead young women so that he could become a mystic healer. Suradji thought that it would take him too long to encounter 70 women who had died of natural causes, so he decided to speed up the process through killing. As a sorcerer, or dukun, a steady stream of women already visited him for various services such as spiritual advice, items that could improve their beauty or wealth, or for Suradji to cast a spell on their spouses to keep them from having an affair. He would then take them into the nearby sugarcane field and bury them up to their waist, claiming it was part of the ritual. He would then proceed to strangle his victims until they were dead and then drink their saliva. After, he'd strip the clothes from their bodies to accelerate decomposition and bury them completely with their heads pointing toward his house. Suradji stated the following to the police:

Trial
The trial began on 11 December 1997, with a 363-page charge against him; Suradji maintained his innocence. His three wives—all sisters—were also arrested for assisting in the murders and helping to hide the bodies. One of his wives, Tumini, was tried as his accomplice. They claimed they confessed under torture by the police. He was found guilty on 27 April 1998 by a three-judge panel in Lubuk Pakam. He was sentenced to death by firing squad. There were cheers from a large crowd in the courtroom as the verdict was read out. More than 100 people had packed into the small courtroom while as many followed the proceedings outside on a television screen. Suradji's wife, Tumini, was also sentenced to death for assisting with the murders, but her sentence was later reduced to life in prison.

Death
His three wives, who were sisters, were also arrested for assisting in the murders and helping him hide the 
bodies. One of his wives, Tumini, was tried as his accomplice and was sentenced to death before it was reduced to life imprisonment. He was sentenced to death by firing squad and executed on 10 July 2008.

See also
List of serial killers by country
List of serial killers by number of victims

References

External links
Indonesian sorcerer sentenced to death BBC News Online 27 April 1998
Chicago Tribune
TransWorld News
Detik News 

1949 births
2008 deaths
21st-century executions by Indonesia
Crimes involving Satanism or the occult
Executed Indonesian serial killers
Executed Indonesian people
Indonesian murderers of children
Indonesian people convicted of murder
Male serial killers
People convicted of murder by Indonesia
People executed by Indonesia by firing squad
People from Medan
Violence against women in Indonesia